Allium cratericola is a species of wild onion known by the common name Cascade onion. It is endemic to California, where is an uncommon member of the flora in several of the state's mountain ranges, including the northern and southern California Coast Ranges, the western Transverse Ranges, Klamath Mountains, and the Sierra Nevada foothills. Its range covers much of the state, from Riverside County to Siskiyou County.

Description
There are one or two long, pointed leaves up to four times the length of the stem. The umbel contains up to 20 flowers clustered densely together.

References

External links

cratericola
Endemic flora of California
Flora of the Klamath Mountains
Flora of the Sierra Nevada (United States)
Natural history of the California chaparral and woodlands
Natural history of the California Coast Ranges
Natural history of the Central Valley (California)
Natural history of the Transverse Ranges
Plants described in 1934
Taxa named by Alice Eastwood
Onions